Tiko Frederick Campbell (August 7, 1947 – February 16, 2012) was an American author and architect from the Washington, D.C. area. Campbell was the ex-husband of the late author Bebe Moore Campbell, and father of actress Maia Campbell. He was also the author of an adventure/sci-fi novel named The Light in the Stones: ...from the tales of Fibinacci...

References

 
 

African-American novelists
Artists from Washington, D.C.
20th-century American architects
1947 births
2012 deaths
21st-century American architects
American science fiction writers
Architects from Washington, D.C.
Writers from Washington, D.C.
20th-century African-American artists
21st-century African-American artists